A giant virus, sometimes referred to as a girus, is a very large virus, some of which are larger than typical bacteria. All known giant viruses belong to the phylum Nucleocytoviricota.

Description
While the exact criteria as defined in the scientific literature vary, giant viruses are generally described as viruses having large, pseudo-icosahedral capsids (200 to 400 nanometers in diameter) that may be surrounded by a thick (approximately 100 nm) layer of filamentous protein fibers. The viruses have large, double-stranded DNA genomes (300 to >1000 kilobasepairs) that encode a large contingent of genes (of the order of 1000 genes).  The best characterized giant viruses are the phylogenetically related mimivirus and megavirus, which belong to the family Mimiviridae (aka Megaviridae), and are distinguished by their large capsid diameters. Giant viruses from the deep ocean, terrestrial sources, and human patients contain genes encoding cytochrome P450 (CYP; P450) enzymes. The origin of these P450 genes in giant viruses remains unknown but may have been acquired from an ancient host.

The genomes of many giant viruses encode many unusual genes that are not found in other viruses, including genes involved in glycolysis and the TCA cycle, fermentation, and the cytoskeleton.

History 
The first giant viruses to be described were chloroviruses of the family Phycodnaviridae. These were discovered in 1981 by Russel H. Meints, James L. Van Etten, Daniel Kuczmarski, Kit Lee, and Barbara Ang. The first chlorovirus was initially called HVCV (Hydra viridis Chlorella virus) since it was first found to infect Chlorella-like algae.

Other giant viruses that infected marine flagellates were described later. The first mimivirus (BV-PW1) was described in 1995, but was not recognized as such until its sequenced genome was released as Cafeteria roenbergensis virus (CroV) in 2010. Subsequently, the Giant Virus Acanthamoeba polyphaga Mimivirus was characterized (which had been mistaken as a bacterium in 1993), and then sequenced. The term "girus" was coined to refer to the group in 2006.

Genetics and evolution
The genomes of giant viruses are the largest known for viruses, and contain genes that encode for important elements of translation machinery, a characteristic that had previously been believed to be indicative of cellular organisms.  These genes include multiple genes encoding a number of aminoacyl tRNA synthetases, enzymes that catalyze the esterification of specific amino acids or their precursors to their corresponding cognate tRNAs to form an aminoacyl tRNA that is then used during translation.  The presence of four aminoacyl tRNA synthetase encoding genes in mimivirus and mamavirus genomes, both species within the Mimiviridae family, as well as the discovery of seven aminoacyl tRNA synthetase genes in the megavirus genome (including those in Mimiviridae) provide evidence that these large DNA viruses may have evolved from a shared cellular genome ancestor by means of genome reduction.

The discovery and subsequent characterization of giant viruses has triggered debate on their evolutionary origins. The two main hypotheses are that they evolved from small viruses by picking up DNA from host organisms; or that they evolved from very complicated organisms via genome reduction, losing various functions including self-reproduction. The possible complicated ancestral organism is also a topic of debate: by one proposal, it might represent a fourth domain of life, but this has been largely discounted.

Comparison of largest known giant viruses

The whole list is in the Giant Virus Toplist created by the Giant Virus Finder software.

1Mutator S (MutS) and its homologs are a family of DNA mismatch repair proteins involved in the mismatch repair system that acts to correct point mutations or small insertion/deletion loops produced during DNA replication, increasing the fidelity of replication.
2A stargate is a five-pronged star structure present on the viral capsid forming the portal through which the internal core of the particle is delivered to the host's cytoplasm.

See also

 Cafeteria roenbergensis virus
 Klosneuvirus
 Mimivirus
 Nucleocytoviricota
 Pandoravirus
 Pithovirus
 Mamavirus

References

Nucleocytoplasmic large DNA viruses